The England national cricket team visited Australia in January 1988 and played one Test match at the Sydney Cricket Ground against the Australia national cricket team. The Test match was drawn and the teams also played a Limited Overs International (LOI) at the Melbourne Cricket Ground, won by Australia. England were in Australia as part of the country's Bicentenary celebrations of 1988. The Ashes were not at stake in the one-off Bicentennial Test.

Bicentennial Test

One-Day International Match

References

Further reading
 Playfair Cricket Annual 1988 edition
 Wisden Cricketers Almanack 1988 edition

1987–88 Australian cricket season
1988 in English cricket
1988 in Australian cricket
1988
International cricket competitions from 1985–86 to 1988